Scott Wood (born December 31, 1968) is a former American football quarterback who played five seasons with the San Jose SaberCats of the Arena Football League (AFL). He played college football at Saint Mary's College of California.

Professional career
Wood first played for the AFL's San Jose SaberCats from 1995 to 1997. He briefly retired from football in 1998. He returned to the SaberCats in 1999, starting 13 games and recording 45 touchdown passes. Wood also set team single-season records with 422 pass attempts, 235 completions and 3,069 yards. He played for the team till 2000. He signed with the SaberCats on July 18, 2002, returning to serve as John Dutton's backup. Wood was later signed to the team's practice squad on April 30, 2004 and released by the SaberCats on June 30, 2004.

Personal life
Scott currently teaches at College Park High School in Pleasant Hill, California.

References

External links
Just Sports Stats

Living people
1968 births
Players of American football from Anaheim, California
American football quarterbacks
Saint Mary's Gaels football players
San Jose SaberCats players